Walter Zürn (born August 21, 1937) is a German physicist and seismologist. His field of interest is tides and seismic vibrations. The Zurn Peak (1515m) in Antarctica is named for him.

Education
Zurn studied physics in Stuttgart, Germany. He wrote his thesis at the "Institute of Metal Physics".

Career
After graduation, he spent four years at the "University of California" (UCLA).

Antarctic research
From 1971 to 1972, Zurn was Science Manager at the Amundsen–Scott South Pole Station in Antarctica. He said of the station,
"This spot at the bottom of the world is a good observation post for numerous reasons including altitude, high magnetic latitude, remoteness from human interference and the ocean."

Research in Germany
Walter Zürn returned to Germany in 1974. He worked in the newly founded German Geophysical Society at the Universities of Stuttgart and Karlsruhe. In the 1980s, he worked with Gerhard Müller on experiments on Newton's law of universal gravitation. In 2004, the first Rebeur-Paschwitz Prize of the German Geophysical Society was awarded to Zürn for his outstanding scientific achievements in the field of geophysics.

Honors
Antarctic Medal of Merit of the United States (1976)
Rebeur-Pashtun Prize of German Geophysical Society (2004)

Publications

References

1937 births
Living people
German geophysicists
Seismologists